Rickhill is a surname. Notable people with the surname include:

William Rickhill, English politician
John Rickhill, MP

See also
Rick Hill